Ülenurme Parish was a rural municipality in Tartu County, Estonia, directly south of Tartu.

In 2017 the Government of Estonia (Estonian: Vabariigi Valitsus) decided to merge Ülenurme Parish into Kambja Parish by administrative reform. Ülenurme Parish Council did not wish to voluntarily join, challenging compulsory affiliation to the Supreme Court, but lost their case.

There were four small towns in the rural municipality: Külitse, Räni, Tõrvandi, and Ülenurme. They account for 7/10 of the rural municipality's inhabitants.

Ülenurme got its name from the Ülenurme manor built at the beginning of the 17th century.

Due to the proximity to the city of Tartu, a large-scale real estate development took place in Ülenurme during the economic boom, resulting in the new housing estates of Männi, Aasa and Mõis. Due to this, the number of residents of the village and the Räni has risen rapidly, and they were therefore named small towns in 2013.

The area contains Tartu Airport, where the Estonian Aviation Academy (Estonian: Eesti Lennuakadeemia) operates.

The Tallinn-Tartu-Võru-Luhamaa road, Jõhvi-Tartu-Valga main road, Tartu-Valga railway line, and Tartu-Koidula railway line pass through the area.

The Ilmatsalu River and Porijõgi flow through the valley located in Ülenurme Parish.

The last Ülenurme Parish governor was Aivar Aleksejev.

It had a population of 4,773 (as of 1 January 2009) and covered an area of 86.35 km².

Settlements
Small boroughs
Külitse - Räni - Tõrvandi - Ülenurme

Villages
Laane - Läti - Lemmatsi - Lepiku - Õssu - Reola - Soinaste - Soosilla - Täsvere - Uhti

References

External links

 

Municipalities of Estonia
Populated places in Tartu County